Kendel may refer to:

Kendel (river), river of North Rhine-Westphalia, Germany
Kendel (surname)

See also
Kendal (disambiguation)
Kendell (disambiguation)